McKew is a surname. Notable people with the surname include:

Cecil McKew (1887–1974), Australian cricketer
Maxine McKew (born 1953), Australian politician and journalist
Robert McKew (died 1944), British military chaplain
Shane McKew (born 1949), Australian rules footballer

See also
McKee